Nagavarma may refer to:

 Nagavarma I, (c. 990) noted Jain writer and poet in the Kannada language, author of Karnataka Kadambari and Chandombudhi
 Nagavarma II, Kannada language scholar and grammarian of the 11th or 12th century Western Chalukya court centred in Basavakalyan